Clifford Richardson is a Leitrim Gaelic footballer and Australian rules footballer who represented Ireland at the Australian Football International Cup.

Playing career

Gaelic football
The Carrigallen GAA clubman represented the Leitrim county team at Junior & senior level, playing in the 2010 FBD Insurance League & the National Football League (Ireland) Div. 4 campaign.

Australian football
Cliff played for the Ireland national Australian rules football team in the 2005 Australian Football International Cup, in Melbourne and returned with the team for the 2008 Australian Football International Cup, reaching the semi finals on both occasions and was selected on the International Cup All Star Team in 2005. He returned with the Ireland squad to help them reclaim the 2011 Australian Football International Cup title, and kicked 3 goals in the tournament.

Rugby
He also plays semi-pro rugby for Buccaneers RFC in the AIL league.

References

1983 births
Living people
Gaelic footballers who switched code
Irish rugby union players
Irish players of Australian rules football
Irish expatriate sportspeople in Australia
Leitrim inter-county Gaelic footballers
Buccaneers RFC players
Carrigallen Gaelic footballers